Rajat Dholakia a.k.a. Juku is an Indian composer known for his work on Firaaq (2008), Mirch Masala (1987) and Holi (1985). He has been credited with introducing Chhattisgarhi music to Bollywood, and won the 1991 National Film Award for best music director for the film Dharavi directed and written by Sudhir Mishra and in 1992 won award for the film Sunday directed by Pankaj Adwani

In childhood he learned the Basics of Music from his father, Shri Dileep Dholakia (noted Composer-Singer from Hindi and Gujarati Films, who mastered Classical music in Bhendibazaar Gharana from his guru Ustad Amaanali Khaan Saaheb)

Rajat's main Goal was Music and Film based Technical career, from 1973 he started learning Western music, Staff notation and arrangement of music from The great Western Classical Teacher Pandit Ramprasad Sharma... (Father of famous composer Pyarelal Sharma, of the legendary Laxmikant-Pyarelal duo).

To know the further technicalities of Music, he started learning Classical Guitar from his french friend Mark Salaun (classical and Flemingo guitar master). Then learned arranging film musical score for Songs and Background Music from the great film Arranger Shayamrao Kamble.

He started his career with producing music in Gujarati and Hindi Theatricals. He has given music in around 300 plays so far. 
Juku has contributed sound design and music in around 8000 National and International commercial adfilms and public services films. Currently he is busy composing western classical and fusion symphonies.

Filmography
 Holi (film by Ketan Mehta)
 Kafila (film by Sudhanshu Huku)
 Om-Dar-Ba-Dar (film by Kamal Swaroop)
 Yeh Woh Manzil To Nahin (1987, film by Sudhir Mishra)
 Mirch Masala (1987, film by Ketan Mehta)
 Hun Hunshi Hunshilal (1992, film by Sanjiv Shah)
 Tarpan (1994, film by Vikramsingh)
 Dharavi (film by Sudhir Mishra)
 Sunday (film by Pankaj Advani)
 Tunnu ki Teena (film by Paresh Kaamdar)
 Kahaan Ho Tum (film by Vijay Kumar)
 Maharathi (film by Shivam Nayar)
 Firaque (film by Nandita Das)
 The Good Road (film by Gyan Korea)
 Saptapdii (film by Niranjan Thade)
 Fisherwoman and Tuk Tuk  (Short Film by Suresh Eriyat)

Background score and sound design
 Brocades of Varanasi (documentary by Paresh Mehta)
 Rabaries of Kutchh (documentary by Paresh Mehta)
 BaanSagar (documentary by Rajendra Jaangle)
 Delinquents (documentary by VijayKumar)
 Mujse Dosti karoge (film by Gopi Desai)
 Figures of Thoughts (1990) (short film by Arun Khopkar)
 Colors of Absence (short film by Arun Khopkar)
 TotaNama (animated film by Chandita Mukherjee)
 Before My Eyes (film by ManiKaul)
 Musician Of Gujarat (documentary by Paresh Mehta)
 Sanchaari (documentary by Arun Khopker)
 Siddheshwari (film by Manikaul)
 Maya Memsaab (background music)
 Parinda (associate in background score and sound design, film by Vidhu Vinod Chopra)
 1942 Love Story (associate in background score and sound design, film by Vidhu Vinod Chopra)
 Is raat ki Subah Nahi (background score, film by Sudhir Mishra)
 Phir Kabhi (background score, film by VKPrakash)
 Delhi 6 (3 songs, film by Rakesh Mehra along with A.R. Rehman)

References

External links
 

Living people
Indian film score composers
Musicians from Chhattisgarh
Best Music Direction National Film Award winners
1957 births
People from Rajkot
20th-century Indian composers
21st-century Indian composers